A Soldier and a Maker is a piece of musical theatre written by Iain Burnside on the life story of the World War l poet and composer Ivor Gurney. It premiered in April 2012 at the Guildhall School of Music and Drama, with Richard Goulding as Gurney. The production was designed by Giuseppe and Emma Belli. It was later adapted into a radio play broadcast on BBC Radio 3 on 29 June 2014 as part of the "Music in the Great War" season. The radio adaptation retained many of the stage cast.

Cast

Reception 
The show was praised for its book and for Goulding's performance as Gurney. There was some criticism of some of the supporting cast's acting.

References

External links 
"Iain Burnside presents A Soldier and a Maker", Guildhall School of Music and Drama, Retrieved 7 July 2014

2012 plays
Plays about World War I
British plays